Qareh Qaj (also Romanized as Qareh Qāj; also known as Qarah Qāch, Qara Qāj, Qareh Qāch, and Qareh Qāreh) is a village in Horr Rural District, Dinavar District, Sahneh County, Kermanshah Province, Iran. At the 2006 census, its population was 311, in 77 families.

References 

Populated places in Sahneh County